Julienne Mavoungou Makaya is a politician from the Republic of Congo. She is a member of the African Union's Economic, Social and Cultural Council representing Central Africa.

Economic, Social and Cultural Council Standing Committee members
Year of birth missing (living people)
Living people
21st-century Republic of the Congo women politicians
21st-century Republic of the Congo politicians
Place of birth missing (living people)